Ljunghia is a genus of mites in the family Laelapidae.

Species
 Ljunghia africana Fain, 1991
 Ljunghia bristowi (Finnegan)
 Ljunghia hoggi Domrow, 1975
 Ljunghia minor Fain, 1989
 Ljunghia novaecaledoniae Fain, 1991
 Ljunghia pulleinei Womersley, 1956
 Ljunghia rainbowi Domrow, 1975
 Ljunghia selenocosmiae Oudemans, 1932

References

Laelapidae